Barsoi Assembly constituency was an assembly constituency in Katihar district in the Indian state of Bihar.

It was part of Katihar Lok Sabha constituency.

This constituency ceased to exist in 2010 with the implementation of the Delimitation Commission of India. Most of the area under the erstwhile Barsoi Assembly constituency seat now falls under Balrampur, Bihar Assembly constituency since 2010.

Election results

1971-2005
In the October 2005 state assembly elections, Munaf Alam of CPI(ML)L won the Barsoi assembly seat defeating Dulal Chandra Goswami of BJP. Contests in most years were multi cornered but only winners and runners are being mentioned. Mahboob Alam of CPI(ML)L defeated Dulal Chandra Goswami of BJP in February 2005 and 2000. Dulal Chandra Goswami of BJP defeated Munnaf Alam of CPI(ML)L in 1995. Siddique of JD defeated Mahboob Alam, Independent, in 1990. Prof. Beaulah Doja of Congress defeated Mahboob Alam of CPI(M) in 1985. Beaulah Doja of Congress also defeated Yuvraj of Janata Party (JP) in 1980. She was first elected to the Bihar Assembly from Barsoi in 1971 and was made Minister of State for Social Welfare and Family Planning in the government headed by Shri Kedar Pandey as Chief Minister. Prof. Beaulah Doja is still remembered as one of architects of laying the foundation of all round development of Barsoi & Balrampur area which remained neglected for a long time since independence. Her major achievements are electrification of each and every village of the constituency. The network of roads which have taken shape in last two decades were all sanctioned during her tenure. Being an educationist, she laid the foundation of Beaulah Doja college at Radheshyam Nagar near Barsoi, which is popularly known as B.D. College. She is one of the donors of this college and her contribution for the constituency is unparalleled till date. 
Abu Nayeem Chand, Independent, defeated Siddique of JP in 1977.

References

Former assembly constituencies of Bihar
Politics of Katihar district